The Kyllakh Range is a range of mountains in the Russian Federation. Administratively the mountain chain belongs to the Sakha Republic. It is the smallest of the ranges which are part of the southern prolongation of the Verkhoyansk Range, East Siberian System.

Geography
It is bound in the north by the Khanda river. To the west it is limited by the banks of the Aldan River and to the south by the Allakh-Yun river.

Flora
The slopes of the range are largely bare, but may be covered by larch taiga in slopes just above valleys, as well as birch in slopes facing the Aldan. Most of the river valleys are swampy with widespread moss growth.

See also
List of mountains and hills of Russia

References

External links

Geography of Russia - Mountains of North-Eastern Siberia (in Russian)
Tourist routes of Yakutia 
Verkhoyansk Range
Mountain ranges of the Sakha Republic

ceb:Kyllakhskiy Khrebet